The Piedmont Exposition of 1887 was the first exposition ever held in Piedmont Park in Atlanta, Georgia.

Founding of the Piedmont Exposition Company
The Piedmont Exposition Company was founded in June 1887 by a group of men who met in the offices of the Atlanta Constitution. The company's chief purpose was to organize the Piedmont Exhibition for the purpose of exhibiting the natural resources of the Piedmont region, including Georgia, North Carolina, South Carolina, Tennessee, and Alabama.

Directors
Oliver Clyde Fuller
John Tyler Cooper
 G. M. Bain
 E. P. Chamberlin
 M. C. Kiser
James W. English
 T. D. Meador
 John A. Fitten
 G. W. Adair
 C. D. Horn
 J. Kingsbury
 J. R. Wylie 
 S. H. Phelan
 W. L. Peel
 W. W. Boyd
 T. L. Langston
 E. Rich
 P. H. Snook
Rufus Brown Bullock
Samuel M. Inman

Executive committee
John Tyler Cooper
 J. R. Wylie
 S. H. Phelan
 C. D. Horn
 G. M. Bain
 E. P. Chamberlin
Rufus Brown Bullock

Planning
Planning of the exposition took only 104 days from the time the company was formed.  The main plan called for the clearing out of a  forest, an area now known as Piedmont Park, as well as the construction of several expensive buildings and a horse racetrack.,

Opening
The Piedmont Exposition of 1887, the first exposition ever held in Piedmont Park, opened on October 10.  The first day opened with 20,000 visitors.  Opening orations were performed by Governor Gordon and Hon. Samuel J. Randall of Pennsylvania.  Randall opened the Exposition with a speech on the success of the resurrected post-civil war south.  When his speech concluded, General Pierce M. B. Young and his men fired cannons to signal the opening of the events.

Exhibitors showed off a variety of items including works of art, local raw materials like manganese marble, and wood work.  Many prominent figures of the day were in attendance to see the displays.  Governor David B. Hill of New York spoke at the event as well as President Grover Cleveland who attended with his young wife, Frances Folsom, on October 19.  Over 50,000 people were in attendance for Cleveland's speech.  The event closed on October 22 with a total attendance of about 200,000.  When the exposition was over, civic leaders said that it had successfully expanded Atlanta's reputation as a place to visit and to conduct business.

The Exposition was also a chance for Atlanta to prove that it was ready to host the World's Fair.  The executive committee of the fair was invited to attend the event under the bidding of Charles Reynolds, secretary of the Piedmont Exposition Company.

See also
International Cotton Exposition, 1881 in Atlanta
Cotton States and International Exposition, 1895 in Atlanta

Notes

References
"Grover Cleveland." The White House Official Website. n.d. Accessed on 2008-06-05.
"MR. RANDALL IN ATLANTA: At the Opening of the Piedmont Exhibition." The New York Times. October 11, 1887. Accessed on 2008-06-05.
Newman, Harvey K.  "Cotton Expositions in Atlanta". The New Georgia Encyclopedia. August 24, 2006. Accessed on 2008-06-05.
"1887 Piedmont Exposition Main Building." The New Georgia Encyclopedia. October 15, 1887. Accessed on 2008-06-05.
Reed, Wallace Putnam. History of Atlanta, Georgia: With Illustrations and Biographical Sketches of Some of it Prominent Men and Pioneers. (1889) Syracuse, NY:D. Mason & Co.
"TO BID FOR VOTES IN GEORGIA." The New York Times. October 13, 1889. Accessed on 2008-06-05.
"WORLD’S FAIR SCHEMES: Proposed Financial Aid from the City." The New York Times.  October 8, 1889. Accessed on 2008-06-05.

History of Atlanta
World's fairs in Georgia (U.S. state)
1887 in Georgia (U.S. state)
19th century in Atlanta
1887 festivals